Vollmöller is a surname of:

 Karl Vollmöller (1878-1948), German philologist, archaeologist, poet, playwright, screenwriter, and aircraft designer
 Karl Vollmöller (philologist) (1848-1922), German philologist

German-language surnames